Peet Pienaar (born 29 August 1971 near Potchefstroom, South Africa) is a South African performance artist, most famous for having himself videotaped while undergoing circumcision in 2000. The discarded foreskin, displayed in a small perspex case, was part of an installation with a three-monitor video showing the circumcision operation in excruciating close-up.

He studied fine art at the University of Stellenbosch graduating in 1994

Pienaar was first noticed by a wider public in 1996 when he (once a provincial rugby union player), the son of Afrikaans speaking farmers, dressed as a Springbok rugby player, stood motionless for hours in venues ranging from the South African National Gallery to shopping malls.

Rugby union is the national obsession among many white, mostly Afrikaans speaking South Africans, and Pienaar wanted on to explore the homoerotic aspect of the myths and hero-worship with which players are treated, and the constructs which define masculinity in a patriarchal society.

"I'm using art as an excuse to live a very interesting life - it allows you to be whoever you want to be, do whatever you want to do, go where ever you want to go. It's like a free ticket" .

Peet Pienaar is also the editor and co-designer of Afro Magazine with its main aim to celebrate the outstanding creativity and designs of the African continent. The magazine is the brainchild of his collaborative association with other artists called Daddy buy me a pony, and won a Golden Clio for its innovative design.

References 
Artthrob.co.za
Jhblive.co.za

Afrikaner people
Stellenbosch University alumni
1971 births
Living people